Bernard Mulrenin,  (1803 – 22 March 1868) was an Irish painter best known for his miniatures.

He is associated with the early Celtic Revival movement, and is remembered for his leadership and frequent exhibitions at the Royal Hibernian Academy. The subjects of Mulrenin's portraiture include individuals connected to Irish Nationalism, both Protestant and Catholic.

Biography
Mulrenin was born in Sligo, a county in the Irish province of Connacht. He developed his techniques for illustration and painting with the support of his local community, practicing primarily in portrait miniatures. To supplement his work as a painter, Mulrenin found employment with the Ordnance Survey in Ireland.

In 1825, Mulrenin moved to Dublin. Within the year, he was able to exhibit a selection of his works at the newly-established Royal Hibernian Academy. An early friend and patron of Mulrenin's in Dublin was the novelist Lady Morgan, who introduced Mulrenin to politicians and creatives including Amelia Curran, Lord Charlemont, Thomas Moore, Richard Lalor Sheil, and Chief Baron Woulfe. In the 1830s, Mulrenin experienced continued growth in his business, especially after the death of John Comerford in 1832 and the relocation of Samuel Lover to London in 1835, since both men were viewed as Ireland's preeminent miniaturists.

Mulrenin received a court appointment from the Earl of Clarendon in 1848, and his first exhibition at the Royal Academy of Arts in 1851. Nevertheless, he remained loyal to the RHA, exhibiting over 400 works in his lifetime. External pressures on public buying power, such as the Great Famine, however, led the academy to a financial crisis in the 1850s. In March 1856, Michael Angelo Hayes was elected secretary and, with the support of the president Martin Cregan and the treasurer Joseph Kirk, pressed for reform. Mulrenin and his colleague Mulvany resisted these measures, and in December 1856, the academy elected Mulrenin and George Petrie in place of Hayes and Cregan, respectively. The election was disputed, and appeals for resolution were made to Lord Lieutenant George Howard, but he did not intervene. The school was closed temporarily the following year.

In 1859, Mulrenin read a paper before the Royal Dublin Society's fine arts section (which included the Photographic Society of Ireland). In the speech, Mulrenin argued that photography could be used as an aide, instead of a replacement, to portrait painting. He claimed to have devised a process of transferring negatives to marble and ivory, rendering the image like a miniature painting. In 1864, Mulrenin's portrait of Oscar Wilde's mother exhibited at the RHA. He was a witness for the Wilde's defense in the libel case brought against them by Mary Travers.

Works in collections

 National Gallery of Ireland
 National Library of Ireland
 National Portrait Gallery
 Victoria and Albert Museum
 British Museum
 Harry Ransom Center

Selected portraits

Other notable subjects

Scientists and Academics
 John Thomas Gilbert
 Charles Graves
 Martin Haverty
 Eugene O'Curry
 John O'Donovan
 William Reeves
 James Henthorn Todd

Politicians and Nobility
 Thomas Esmonde
 Thomas Larcom
 Edward Lawless
Other
 Frances Mary Teresa Ball
 Denis Florence MacCarthy
 William Wilde

Though he preferred to depict his contemporaries, Mulrenin also drew inspiration from non-historical figures, such as Shakespeare's King Lear and the mythological Fionn-ghuala, daughter of the sea god Lir.

References

External links

 http://www.artnet.com/artists/bernard-mulrenin/past-auction-results
  Royal Hibernian Academy of Arts

1803 births
1868 deaths
19th-century Irish painters
Irish male painters
Irish portrait painters
19th-century Irish male artists
People from County Sligo